Wong Choong Hann  (born 17 February 1977) is a former badminton player from Malaysia. He was the first Malaysian to win a medal in the men's singles event at the BWF World Championships. Currently he is the coaching director for the Malaysia national badminton team.

Career 

Wong Choong Hann's career began with the 1996 Malaysia Open. The first tournament he won was the 1997 Dutch Open. He represented Malaysia in 2002, where Malaysia emerged runners-up to Indonesia in the Thomas Cup championships.

In 2003, Wong reached the World Championships finals. In a thrilling three-set match between the veterans (both he and his opponent were above 24 years old then), he eventually lost out to the champion from China, Xia Xuanze.

Wong played badminton at the 2004 Summer Olympics in men's singles, defeating Przemysław Wacha of Poland in the first round. In the round of 16, he was defeated by Taufik Hidayat of Indonesia.

The low point of his career occurred during the 2006 Thomas Cup when he injured himself by snapping an achilles tendon while playing in a quarter final match against South Korea, and was required to rest for almost 6 months. He made a comeback to the sport in the Asian Games later in 2006 but was clearly off form.

In the 2008 Summer Olympics he defeated reigning Olympic champion Taufik Hidayat but once again failed to advance past the round of 16, losing to Hsieh Yu-hsing of Chinese Taipei.

He has set up a company "Pioneer Sdn Bhd" with former shuttlers Lee Wan Wah, Chan Chong Ming, and Chew Choon Eng to conduct badminton programmes and hopefully produce world-class shuttlers for Malaysia.

In May 2010, Wong was called back to play for the Malaysian Thomas Cup squad.

In 2011 he played his last world championship, where he lost to Boonsak Ponsana in the second round.

Personal life 
Wong Choong Hann married Leaw Pik Sim on 11 June 2005. They have a daughter, named Kyra Wong Xinyue, and a son, named Kayden Wong Zixuan. He currently resides in Sri Petaling, Kuala Lumpur. In September 2012, he co-founded LavieFlo International—the first preserved flower retailer in Malaysia.

Achievements

World Championships 
Men's singles

Commonwealth Games 
Men's singles

Men's doubles

Southeast Asian Games 
Men's singles

Men's doubles

BWF Superseries 
The BWF Superseries, which was launched on 14 December 2006 and implemented in 2007, is a series of elite badminton tournaments, sanctioned by the Badminton World Federation (BWF). BWF Superseries levels are Superseries and Superseries Premier. A season of Superseries consists of twelve tournaments around the world that have been introduced since 2011. Successful players are invited to the Superseries Finals, which are held at the end of each year.

Men's singles

  BWF Superseries Finals tournament
  BWF Superseries Premier tournament
  BWF Superseries tournament

BWF Grand Prix 
The BWF Grand Prix had two levels, the BWF Grand Prix and Grand Prix Gold. It was a series of badminton tournaments sanctioned by the Badminton World Federation (BWF) which was held from 2007 to 2017. The World Badminton Grand Prix has been sanctioned by International Badminton Federation (IBF) from 1983 to 2006.

Men's singles

  BWF Grand Prix Gold tournament
  BWF/IBF Grand Prix tournament

Honour 
  :
  Member of the Order of the Defender of the Realm (A.M.N.) (2000)

References 

1977 births
Living people
Sportspeople from Kuala Lumpur
Malaysian sportspeople of Chinese descent
Malaysian male badminton players
Badminton players at the 2000 Summer Olympics
Badminton players at the 2004 Summer Olympics
Badminton players at the 2008 Summer Olympics
Olympic badminton players of Malaysia
Badminton players at the 1998 Commonwealth Games
Badminton players at the 2002 Commonwealth Games
Badminton players at the 2006 Commonwealth Games
Commonwealth Games gold medallists for Malaysia
Commonwealth Games silver medallists for Malaysia
Commonwealth Games bronze medallists for Malaysia
Commonwealth Games medallists in badminton
Badminton players at the 1998 Asian Games
Badminton players at the 2002 Asian Games
Badminton players at the 2006 Asian Games
Asian Games bronze medalists for Malaysia
Asian Games medalists in badminton
Medalists at the 1998 Asian Games
Medalists at the 2002 Asian Games
Medalists at the 2006 Asian Games
Competitors at the 1999 Southeast Asian Games
Competitors at the 2001 Southeast Asian Games
Competitors at the 2003 Southeast Asian Games
Competitors at the 2005 Southeast Asian Games
Southeast Asian Games gold medalists for Malaysia
Southeast Asian Games silver medalists for Malaysia
Southeast Asian Games bronze medalists for Malaysia
Southeast Asian Games medalists in badminton
World No. 1 badminton players
Badminton coaches
Members of the Order of the Defender of the Realm
Medallists at the 1998 Commonwealth Games
Medallists at the 2002 Commonwealth Games
Medallists at the 2006 Commonwealth Games